The 1948 All-Ireland Minor Football Championship was the 17th staging of the All-Ireland Minor Football Championship, the Gaelic Athletic Association's premier inter-county Gaelic football tournament for boys under the age of 18.

Tyrone entered the championship as defending champions.

On 26 September 1948, Tyrone won the championship following an 0-11 to 1-5 defeat of Dublin in the All-Ireland final. This was their second All-Ireland title overall and their second in succession.

Results

Connacht Minor Football Championship

Munster Minor Football Championship

Ulster Minor Football Championship

Leinster Minor Football Championship

All-Ireland Minor Football Championship
Semi-Finals

Final

Championship statistics

Miscellaneous

 Eddie Devlin of Tyrone becomes the first player to captain a team to two All-Ireland titles.

References

1948
All-Ireland Minor Football Championship